The 2013 Tour de Romandie was the 67th running of the Tour de Romandie cycling stage race. The race consisted of six stages, beginning with a prologue stage in Le Châble on 23 April and concluded with another individual time trial, in Geneva, on 28 April. It was the fourteenth race of the 2013 UCI World Tour season.

Ultimately, Froome won the general classification by 54 seconds over runner-up Simon Špilak, who was the winner of the race's queen stage – the fourth stage – to Les Diablerets, ahead of Froome. Costa finished 55 seconds behind Špilak, and one minute 49 seconds behind Froome.

In the race's other classifications, 's Wilco Kelderman was the winner of the white jersey for the young rider classification as he was the highest placed rider born in 1988 or later, finishing in fifth place overall after taking the jersey from 's Thibaut Pinot during the final time trial.

Teams
As the Tour de Romandie was a UCI World Tour event, all UCI ProTeams were invited automatically and obligated to send a squad. Originally, eighteen ProTeams were scheduled to be invited to the race, with two other squads –  and  – given wildcard places, and as such, would have formed the event's 20-team peloton.  subsequently regained their ProTour status after an appeal to the Court of Arbitration for Sport. With  not originally invited to the race, race organisers announced their inclusion to the race, bringing the total number of teams competing to twenty-one.

The 21 teams that competed in the race were:

Valverde was also in attendance at the race, leading the  alongside Rui Costa, who finished third in 2012.

Stages

Prologue
23 April 2013 — Le Châble to Bruson, individual time trial (ITT)

Prologue Result and General Classification after Prologue

Stage 1
24 April 2013 — Saint-Maurice to Renens–Ouest lausannois,

Stage 2
25 April 2013 — Prilly–Ouest lausannois to Granges–Solothurn,

Stage 3
26 April 2013 — Payerne to Payerne,

Stage 4
27 April 2013 — Marly to Les Diablerets,

Stage 5
28 April 2013 — Geneva, individual time trial (ITT)

Classification leadership table
In the 2013 Tour de Romandie, four different jerseys were awarded. For the general classification, calculated by adding each cyclist's finishing times on each stage, and allowing time bonuses in mass-start stages, the leader received a yellow jersey. This classification was considered the most important of the 2013 Tour de Romandie, and the winner of the classification was considered the winner of the race.

Additionally, there was a young rider classification, which awarded a white jersey. This was decided the same way as the general classification, but only riders born after 1 January 1988 were eligible to be ranked in the classification. There was also a mountains classification, the leadership of which was marked by a pink jersey. In the mountains classification, points were won by reaching the top of a climb before other cyclists, with more points available for the higher-categorised climbs; there were fourteen categorised climbs in the race, split into three distinctive categories.

The fourth jersey represented the sprints classification, marked by a green jersey. In the sprints classification, cyclists received points for finishing in the top 3 at intermediate sprint points during each stage, with the exception of the individual time trial stages. There was also a classification for teams, in which the times of the best three cyclists per team on each stage were added together; the leading team at the end of the race was the team with the lowest total time.

References

External links

Tour de Romandie
Tour de Romandie
Tour de Romandie